In physics and engineering, a phasor (a portmanteau of phase vector) is a complex number  representing a sinusoidal function whose amplitude, angular frequency, and initial phase are time-invariant. It is related to a more general concept called analytic representation, which decomposes a sinusoid into the product of a complex constant and a factor depending on time and frequency.  The complex constant, which depends on amplitude and phase, is known as a phasor, or complex amplitude, and (in older texts) sinor or even complexor.

A common situation in electrical networks powered by time varying current is the existence of multiple sinusoids all with the same frequency, but different amplitudes and phases. The only difference in their analytic representations is the complex amplitude (phasor). A linear combination of such functions can be represented as a linear combination of phasors (known as phasor arithmetic or phasor algebra) and the time/frequency dependent factor that they all have in common.

The origin of the term phasor rightfully suggests that a (diagrammatic) calculus somewhat similar to that possible for vectors is possible for phasors as well. An important additional feature of the phasor transform is that differentiation and integration of sinusoidal signals (having constant amplitude, period and phase) corresponds to simple algebraic operations on the phasors; the phasor transform thus allows the analysis (calculation) of the AC steady state of RLC circuits by solving simple algebraic equations (albeit with complex coefficients) in the phasor domain instead of solving differential equations (with real coefficients) in the time domain. The originator of the phasor transform was Charles Proteus Steinmetz working at General Electric in the late 19th century. He got his inspiration from Oliver Heaviside. Heaviside's operational calculus was modified so that the variable p becomes jw. The complex number j has simple meaning : phase shift.

Glossing over some mathematical details, the phasor transform can also be seen as a particular case of the Laplace transform, which additionally can be used to (simultaneously) derive the transient response of an RLC circuit. However, the Laplace transform is mathematically more difficult to apply and the effort may be unjustified if only steady state analysis is required.

Notation

A vector whose polar coordinates are magnitude  and angle  is written 

The angle may be stated in degrees with an implied conversion from degrees to radians. For example  would be assumed to be  which is the vector  or the number

Definition
A real-valued sinusoid with constant amplitude, frequency, and phase has the form:

where only parameter  is time-variant.  The inclusion of an imaginary component:

gives it, in accordance with Euler's formula, the factoring property described in the lede paragraph:

whose real part is the original sinusoid.  The benefit of the complex representation is that linear operations with other complex representations produces a complex result whose real part reflects the same linear operations with the real parts of the other complex sinusoids.  Furthermore, all the mathematics can be done with just the phasors  and the common factor  is reinserted prior to the real part of the result.

The function  is called the analytic representation of  Figure 2 depicts it as a rotating vector in the complex plane. It is sometimes convenient to refer to the entire function as a phasor, as we do in the next section. But the term phasor usually implies just the static complex number

Arithmetic

Multiplication by a constant (scalar)
Multiplication of the phasor  by a complex constant, produces another phasor.  That means its only effect is to change the amplitude and phase of the underlying sinusoid:

In electronics,  would represent an impedance, which is independent of time.  In particular it is not the shorthand notation for another phasor.  Multiplying a phasor current by an impedance produces a phasor voltage.  But the product of two phasors (or squaring a phasor) would represent the product of two sinusoids, which is a non-linear operation that produces new frequency components. Phasor notation can only represent systems with one frequency, such as a linear system stimulated by a sinusoid.

Addition 

The sum of multiple phasors produces another phasor. That is because the sum of sinusoids with the same frequency is also a sinusoid with that frequency:

where:

and, if we take , then  is:
  if  with  the signum function;
  if ;
  if .

or, via the law of cosines on the complex plane (or the trigonometric identity for angle differences):

where 

A key point is that A3 and θ3 do not depend on ω or t, which is what makes phasor notation possible. The time and frequency dependence can be suppressed and re-inserted into the outcome as long as the only operations used in between are ones that produce another phasor. In angle notation, the operation shown above is written:

In physics, this sort of addition occurs when sinusoids interfere with each other, constructively or destructively.  The static vector concept provides useful insight into questions like this: "What phase difference would be required between three identical sinusoids for perfect cancellation?" In this case, simply imagine taking three vectors of equal length and placing them head to tail such that the last head matches up with the first tail.  Clearly, the shape which satisfies these conditions is an equilateral triangle, so the angle between each phasor to the next is 120° ( radians), or one third of a wavelength . So the phase difference between each wave must also be 120°, as is the case in three-phase power.

In other words, what this shows is that:

In the example of three waves, the phase difference between the first and the last wave was 240°, while for two waves destructive interference happens at 180°. In the limit of many waves, the phasors must form a circle for destructive interference, so that the first phasor is nearly parallel with the last. This means that for many sources, destructive interference happens when the first and last wave differ by 360 degrees, a full wavelength . This is why in single slit diffraction, the minima occur when light from the far edge travels a full wavelength further than the light from the near edge.

As the single vector rotates in an anti-clockwise direction, its tip at point A will rotate one complete revolution of 360° or 2 radians representing one complete cycle. If the length of its moving tip is transferred at different angular intervals in time to a graph as shown above, a sinusoidal waveform would be drawn starting at the left with zero time. Each position along the horizontal axis indicates the time that has elapsed since zero time, . When the vector is horizontal the tip of the vector represents the angles at 0°, 180°, and at 360°.

Then the time axis of the waveform represents the angle either in degrees or radians through which the phasor has moved. So we can say that a phasor represents a scaled voltage or current value of a rotating vector which is "frozen" at some point in time, and in our example above, this is at an angle of 30°.

Sometimes when we are analysing alternating waveforms we may need to know the position of the phasor, representing the alternating quantity at some particular instant in time especially when we want to compare two different waveforms on the same axis. For example, voltage and current. We have assumed in the waveform above that the waveform starts at time  with a corresponding phase angle in either degrees or radians.

But if a second waveform starts to the left or to the right of this zero point, or if we want to represent in phasor notation the relationship between the two waveforms, then we will need to take into account this phase difference,  of the waveform. Consider the diagram below from the previous Phase Difference tutorial.

Differentiation and integration 
The time derivative or integral of a phasor produces another phasor.  For example:

Therefore, in phasor representation, the time derivative of a sinusoid becomes just multiplication by the constant .

Similarly, integrating a phasor corresponds to multiplication by  The time-dependent factor,  is unaffected.

When we solve a linear differential equation with phasor arithmetic, we are merely factoring  out of all terms of the equation, and reinserting it into the answer. For example, consider the following differential equation for the voltage across the capacitor in an RC circuit:

When the voltage source in this circuit is sinusoidal:

we may substitute 

where phasor  and phasor  is the unknown quantity to be determined.

In the phasor shorthand notation, the differential equation reduces to:

Solving for the phasor capacitor voltage gives:

In polar coordinate form, the first term of the last expression is:

where .

Therefore:

Ratio of phasors 

A quantity called complex impedance is the ratio of two phasors, which is not a phasor, because it does not correspond to a sinusoidally varying function.

Applications

Circuit laws 

With phasors, the techniques for solving DC circuits can be applied to solve linear AC circuits.

 Ohm's law for resistors A resistor has no time delays and therefore doesn't change the phase of a signal therefore  remains valid.
 Ohm's law for resistors, inductors, and capacitors  where  is the complex impedance.
 Kirchhoff's circuit laws Work with voltages and current as complex phasors.

In an AC circuit we have real power which is a representation of the average power into the circuit and reactive power (Q) which indicates power flowing back and forth.

Given this we can apply the techniques of analysis of resistive circuits with phasors to analyze single frequency linear AC circuits containing resistors, capacitors, and inductors. Multiple frequency linear AC circuits and AC circuits with different waveforms can be analyzed to find voltages and currents by transforming all waveforms to sine wave components (using Fourier series) with magnitude and phase then analyzing each frequency separately, as allowed by the superposition theorem. This solution method applies only to inputs that are sinusoidal and for solutions that are in steady state, i.e., after all transients have died out.

The concept is frequently involved in representing an electrical impedance. In this case, the phase angle is the phase difference between the voltage applied to the impedance and the current driven through it.

Power engineering
In analysis of three phase AC power systems, usually a set of phasors is defined as the three complex cube roots of unity, graphically represented as unit magnitudes at angles of 0, 120 and 240 degrees. By treating polyphase AC circuit quantities as phasors, balanced circuits can be simplified and unbalanced circuits can be treated as an algebraic combination of symmetrical components. This approach greatly simplifies the work required in electrical calculations of voltage drop, power flow, and short-circuit currents. In the context of power systems analysis, the phase angle is often given in degrees, and the magnitude in RMS value rather than the peak amplitude of the sinusoid.

The technique of synchrophasors uses digital instruments to measure the phasors representing transmission system voltages at widespread points in a transmission network.  Differences among the phasors indicate power flow and system stability.

Telecommunications: analog modulations 

The rotating frame picture using phasor can be a powerful tool to understand analog modulations such as amplitude modulation (and its variants) and frequency modulation.

 where the term in brackets is viewed as a rotating vector in the complex plane.

The waveform  can then be viewed as a projection of this vector onto the real axis. A modulated waveform is represented by this phasor (the carrier) and two additional phasors (the modulation phasors).

, and

.

The two modulation phasors are phased such that their vector sum is always in phase with the carrier phasor.  An alternative representation is two phasors counter rotating around the end of the carrier phasor at a rate  relative to the carrier phasor.  That is,

, and

.

Frequency modulation is a similar representation except that the modulating phasors are not in phase with the carrier.  In this case the vector sum of the modulating phasors is shifted 90° from the carrier phase.  Strictly, frequency modulation representation requires additional small modulation phasors at  etc, but for most practical purposes these are ignored because their effect is very small.

See also 
 In-phase and quadrature components
 Constellation diagram
 Analytic signal, a generalization of phasors for time-variant amplitude, phase, and frequency.
 Complex envelope
 Phase factor, a phasor of unit magnitude

Footnotes

References

Further reading

External links 

 Phasor Phactory
 Visual Representation of Phasors
 Polar and Rectangular Notation
 Phasor in Telecommunication
Electrical circuits
AC power
Interference
Trigonometry